Wanganella lata is a species of sea snail, a marine gastropod mollusk, unassigned in the superfamily Seguenzioidea.

References

External links
 To World Register of Marine Species

lata
Gastropods described in 1954